Ceratobregma helenae, known commonly as the Helen's triplefin, is a species of triplefin blenny. It has an Indo-Pacific distribution from Christmas Island to Samoa, north to Taiwan and south to south eastern Australia. The species is named after Wouter Holleman's wife, Helen.

References

helenae
Taxa named by Wouter Holleman
Fish described in 1987